A gold rush or gold fever is a discovery of gold—sometimes accompanied by other precious metals and rare-earth minerals—that brings an onrush of miners seeking their fortune. Major gold rushes took place in the 19th century in Australia, New Zealand, Brazil, Chile, South Africa,  California, the United States, and Canada while smaller gold rushes took place elsewhere. 

In the 19th century, the wealth that resulted was distributed widely because of reduced migration costs and low barriers to entry. While gold mining itself proved unprofitable for most diggers and mine owners, some people made large fortunes, and merchants and transportation facilities made large profits. The resulting increase in the world's gold supply stimulated global trade and investment. Historians have written extensively about the mass migration, trade, colonization, and environmental history associated with gold rushes.

Gold rushes were typically marked by a general buoyant feeling of a "free-for-all" in income mobility, in which any single individual might become abundantly wealthy almost instantly, as expressed in the California Dream.

Gold rushes helped spur waves of immigration that often led to the permanent settlement of new regions. Activities propelled by gold rushes define significant aspects of the culture of the Australian and  North American frontiers. At a time when the world's money supply was based on gold, the newly-mined gold provided economic stimulus far beyond the goldfields, feeding into local and wider economic booms.

The Gold Rush was a topic that inspired many TV shows and book considering it was a very important topic at the time. During the time, many books were published including Call of the Wild, which had much success during the period.

Gold rushes occurred as early as the times of the Greek Empire, whose gold mining was described by Diodarus Sicules and Pliny the Elder, and probably further back to ancient Greece.

Surviving the Gold Rush
 

Within each mining rush there is typically a transition through progressively higher capital expenditures, larger organizations, and more specialized knowledge. They may also progress from high-unit value to lower-unit value minerals (from gold to silver to base metals).

A rush typically begins with the discovery of placer gold made by an individual. At first the gold may be washed from the sand and gravel by individual miners with little training, using a gold pan or similar simple instrument. Once it is clear that the volume of gold-bearing sediment is larger than a few cubic metres, the placer miners will build rockers or sluice boxes, with which a small group can wash gold from the sediment many times faster than using gold pans. Winning the gold in this manner requires almost no capital investment, only a simple pan or equipment that may be built on the spot, and only simple organisation. The low investment, the high value per unit weight of gold, and the ability of gold dust and gold nuggets to serve as a medium of exchange, allow placer gold rushes to occur even in remote locations.

After the sluice-box stage, placer mining may become increasingly large scale, requiring larger organisations and higher capital expenditures. Small claims owned and mined by individuals may need to be merged into larger tracts. Difficult-to-reach placer deposits may be mined by tunnels. Water may be diverted by dams and canals to placer mine active river beds or to deliver water needed to wash dry placers. The more advanced techniques of ground sluicing, hydraulic mining and dredging may be used.

Typically the heyday of a placer gold rush would last only a few years. The free gold supply in stream beds would become depleted somewhat quickly, and the initial phase would be followed by prospecting for veins of lode gold that were the original source of the placer gold. Hard rock mining, like placer mining, may evolve from low capital investment and simple technology to progressively higher capital and technology. The surface outcrop of a gold-bearing vein may be oxidized, so that the gold occurs as native gold, and the ore needs only to be crushed and washed (free milling ore). The first miners may at first build a simple arrastra to crush their ore; later, they may build stamp mills to crush ore at greater speed. As the miners venture downwards, they may find that the deeper part of vein contains gold locked in sulfide or telluride minerals, which will require smelting. If the ore is still sufficiently rich, it may be worth shipping to a distant smelter (direct shipping ore). Lower-grade ore may require on-site treatment to either recover the gold or to produce a concentrate sufficiently rich for transport to the smelter. As the district turns to lower-grade ore, the mining may change from underground mining to large open-pit mining.

Many silver rushes followed upon gold rushes. As transportation and infrastructure improve, the focus may change progressively from gold to silver to base metals. In this way, Leadville, Colorado started as a placer gold discovery, achieved fame as a silver-mining district, then relied on lead and zinc in its later days. Butte, Montana began mining placer gold, then became a silver-mining district, then became for a time the world's largest copper producer.

By region

Australia and New Zealand 

Various gold rushes occurred in Australia over the second half of the 19th century. The most significant of these, although not the only ones, were the New South Wales gold rush and Victorian gold rush in 1851, and the Western Australian gold rushes of the 1890s. They were highly significant to their respective colonies' political and economic development as they brought many immigrants, and promoted massive government spending on infrastructure to support the new arrivals who came looking for gold. While some found their fortune, those who did not often remained in the colonies and took advantage of extremely liberal land laws to take up farming.

Gold rushes happened at or around:

In New Zealand the Central Otago Gold Rush from 1861 attracted prospectors from the California Gold Rush and the Victorian Gold Rush and many moved on to the West Coast Gold Rush from 1864.

North America

The first significant gold rush in the United States was in Cabarrus County, North Carolina (east of Charlotte), in 1799 at today's Reed's Gold Mine. Thirty years later, in 1829, the Georgia Gold Rush in the southern Appalachians occurred. It was followed by the California Gold Rush of 1848–55 in the Sierra Nevada, which captured the popular imagination. The California gold rush led directly to the settlement of California by Americans and the rapid entry of that state into the union in 1850. The gold rush in 1849 stimulated worldwide interest in prospecting for gold, and led to new rushes in Australia, South Africa, Wales and Scotland. Successive gold rushes occurred in western North America: Fraser Canyon, the Cariboo district and other parts of British Columbia, in Nevada, in the Rocky Mountains in Colorado, Idaho, Montana, eastern Oregon, and western New Mexico Territory and along the lower Colorado River. There was a gold rush in Nova Scotia (1861-1876) which produced nearly 210,000 ounces of gold. Resurrection Creek, near Hope, Alaska was the site of Alaska's first gold rush in the mid–1890s. Other notable Alaska Gold Rushes were Nome, Fairbanks, and the Fortymile River.

One of the last "great gold rushes" was the Klondike Gold Rush in Canada's Yukon Territory (1896–99). This gold rush is featured in the novels of Jack London, and Charlie Chaplin's film The Gold Rush. Robert William Service depicted in his poetries the Gold Rush, especially in the book The Trail of '98. The main goldfield was along the south flank of the Klondike River near its confluence with the Yukon River near what was to become Dawson City in Canada's Yukon Territory, but it also helped open up the relatively new US possession of Alaska to exploration and settlement, and promoted the discovery of other gold finds.

The most successful of the North American gold rushes was the Porcupine Gold Rush in Timmins, Ontario area. This gold rush was unique compared to others by the method of extraction of the gold. Placer mining techniques were not able to be used to access the gold in the area due to it being embedded into the Canadian Shield, so larger mining operations involving significantly more expensive equipment was required. While this gold rush peaked in the 1940s and 1950s, it is still active today with over 200 million  ounces of gold having been produced from the region. The gold deposits in this area are identified as one of the largest in the world.

Africa
In South Africa, the Witwatersrand Gold Rush in the Transvaal was important to that country's history, leading to the founding of Johannesburg and tensions between the Boers and British settlers as well as the Chinese miners.

South African gold production went from zero in 1886 to 23% of the total world output in 1896. At the time of the South African rush, gold production benefited from the newly discovered techniques by Scottish chemists, the MacArthur-Forrest process, of using potassium cyanide to extract gold from low-grade ore.

South America

The gold mine at El Callao (Venezuela), started in 1871, was for a time one of the richest in the world, and the goldfields as a whole saw over a million ounces exported between 1860 and 1883. The gold mining was dominated by immigrants from the British Isles and the British West Indies, giving an appearance of almost creating an English colony on Venezuelan territory. 

Between 1883 and 1906 Tierra del Fuego experienced a gold rush attracting many Chileans, Argentines and Europeans to the archipelago. The gold rush begun in 1884 following discovery of gold during the rescue of the French steamship Arctique near Cape Virgenes.

Mining industry today
There are about 10 to 30 million small-scale miners around the world, according to Communities and Small-Scale Mining (CASM). Approximately 100 million people are directly or indirectly dependent on small-scale mining. For example, there are 800,000 to 1.5 million artisanal miners in Democratic Republic of Congo, 350,000 to 650,000 in Sierra Leone, and 150,000 to 250,000 in Ghana, with millions more across Africa.

In an exclusive report, Reuters accounted the smuggling of billions of dollars' worth of gold out of Africa through the United Arab Emirates in the Middle East, which further acts as a gateway to the markets in the United States, Europe and more. The news agency evaluated the worth and magnitude of illegal gold trade occurring in African nations like Ghana, Tanzania, and Zambia, by comparing the total gold imports recorded into the UAE with the exports affirmed by the African states. According to Africa's industrial mining firms, they have not exported any amount of gold to the UAE – confirming that the imports come from other, illegal sources. As per customs data, the UAE imported gold worth $15.1 billion from Africa in 2016, with a total weight of 446 tons, in variable degrees of purity. Much of the exports were not recorded in the African states, which means huge volume of gold imports were carried out with no taxes paid to the states producing it.

By date

Before 1860 
 Brazilian Gold Rush, Minas Gerais (1695)

 Carolina Gold Rush, Cabarrus County, North Carolina, US (1799)

 Georgia Gold Rush, Georgia, US (1828)

 California Gold Rush (1848–55)
 Siberian Gold Rush, Siberia,  Russian Empire

 Queen Charlottes Gold Rush, British Columbia, Canada (1850); the first of many British Columbia gold rushes
 Northern Nevada Gold Rush (1850–1934)
 Victorian gold rush, Victoria, Australia (1851–late 1860s). Known as the Golden Triangle, it incorporated areas such as Ararat, Castlemaine, Marybororgh, Clunes, Bendigo, Ballarat, Daylesford, Beechworth, and Eldorado.
 Kern River Gold Rush, California (1853–58)
 Idaho Gold Rush, near Colville, Washington (1855; also known as the Fort Colville Gold Rush)
 Gila Placers Rush, New Mexico Territory (present-day Arizona; 1858–59)
 Fraser Canyon Gold Rush, British Columbia (1858–61)
 Rock Creek Gold Rush, British Columbia (1859–60s)
 Pike's Peak Gold Rush, Pikes Peak, Kansas Territory (present-day Colorado; 1859)

1860s 
 Holcomb Valley Gold Rush, California (1860–61)
 Clearwater Gold Rush, Idaho (1860)
 Central Otago Gold Rush, New Zealand (1861)
 Eldorado Canyon Rush, New Mexico Territory (present-day Nevada; 1861)
 Colorado River Gold Rush, Arizona Territory (1862–64)
 Boise Basin Gold Rush, Idaho (1862)
 Cariboo Gold Rush, British Columbia (1862–65)
 Montana Gold Rush (1862–69), including:
 Bannack, Virginia City (Alder Gulch), and Helena (Last Chance Gulch) (1862–64)
 Confederate Gulch (1864–69)
 Stikine Gold Rush, British Columbia (1863)
 Owyhee Gold Rush, Southeastern Oregon, Southwestern Idaho (1863)
 Owens Valley Rush, Owens Valley, California (1863–64)
 Leechtown Gold Rush, (south of Sooke Lake), Leech River, Vancouver Island (1864–65)
 West Coast Gold Rush, South Island, New Zealand (1864–67)
 Big Bend Gold Rush, British Columbia (1865—66)
 Francistown Gold Rush,  British Protectorate of Bechuanaland (1867)
 Omineca Gold Rush, British Columbia (1869)
 Wild Horse Creek Gold Rush, British Columbia (1860s)
 Eastern Oregon Gold Rush (1860s–70s)
 Kildonan Gold Rush, Sutherland, Scotland (1869)

1870s 
 Lapland gold rush, Finland, 1870
 El Callao Gold Rush, Venezuela, 1871
 Cassiar Gold Rush, British Columbia, 1871
 Palmer River Gold Rush, Palmer River, Queensland, Australia (1872)
 Pilgrim's Rest, South Africa (1873)
 Black Hills Gold Rush, Black Hills of South Dakota and Wyoming (1874–78)
 Bodie Gold Rush, Bodie, California (1876)
 Kumara Gold Rush, Kumara and Dillmanstown, New Zealand (1876)

1880s 
 Barberton Gold Rush, South Africa (1883)
 Witwatersrand Gold Rush, Transvaal, South Africa (1886); discovery of the largest deposit of gold in the world. The resulting influx of miners became one of the triggers of the Second Boer War of 1899-1902.
 Cayoosh Gold Rush in Lillooet, British Columbia (1884—87)
 Tulameen Gold Rush, near Princeton, British Columbia
 Tierra del Fuego Gold Rush, southernmost Chile and Argentina (1884–1906)
 Baja California Gold Rush, in the Santa Clara mountains about sixty miles southeast of Ensenada (1889)
 Amur gold rush, on the China-Russia border. Some miners in the region formed independent proto-states such as the Zheltuga Republic.

1890s 
 Cripple Creek Gold Rush, Cripple Creek, Colorado (1891)
 Western Australian gold rushes, Kalgoorlie and Coolgardie, Western Australia (1893, 1896)
 Mount Baker Gold Rush, Whatcom County, Washington, United States (1897–1920s)
 Klondike Gold Rush, centered on Dawson City, Yukon, Canada (1896–99)
 Atlin Gold Rush, Atlin, British Columbia (1898)
 Nome Gold Rush, Nome, Alaska (1899–1909)
 Fairview Goldrush, Oliver (Fairview), British Columbia, Canada

20th century 
 Fairbanks Gold Rush, Fairbanks, Alaska (1902–05)
 Goldfield Gold Rush, Goldfield, Nevada
 Porcupine Gold Rush, 1909–11, Timmins, Ontario, Canada – little known, but one of the largest in terms of gold mined, 67 million ounces as of 2001

 Iditarod Gold Rush, Flat, Alaska, 1910–12, where gold was discovered by John Beaton and William A. Dikeman in 1908

 Soviet gold rush - notably involving Gulag slave labor in the Kolyma region
 Kakamega gold rush, Kenya, 1932
 Vatukoula Gold Rush, Fiji, 1932
 Serra Pelada, Brazil
 Mount Diwata Gold Rush, Monkayo, Philippines, 1983-1987

 Amazon Gold Rush, Amazon region, Brazil
 Mount Kare Gold Rush, Enga Province, Papua New Guinea

21st century 
 Great Mongolian Gold Rush, Mongolia (2001)
 Apuí Gold Rush, Apuí, Amazonas, Brazil (2006); approximately 500,000 miners are thought to work in the Amazon's "garimpos" (gold mines).
 Peruvian Amazon gold rush,  Madre de Dios (2009)
 Tibesti Mountains gold rush, Chad, Libya and Niger (2012)
Gold rush in South Kivu, Democratic Republic of the Congo (2021)

See also
 Bandwagon effect
 Diamond rush

References

Further reading
 Ngai, Mae. The Chinese Question: The Gold Rushes and Global Politics (2021), Mid 19c in California, Australia and South Africa

 White, Franklin. Miner with a Heart of Gold - Biography of a Mineral Science and Engineering Educator. FriesenPress. 2020. ISBN 978-1-5255-7765-9 (Hardcover) ISBN 978-1-5255-7766-6 (Paperback) ISBN 978-1-5255-7767-3 (eBook).

External links

Object of History: the Gold Nugget
PBS' American Experience: The Gold Rush
Exploring the California Gold Rush
The Australian Gold Rush
Off to the Klondike! The Search for Gold  — illustrated historical essay

 
History of money
Western (genre) staples and terminology